Saleh Saad (born 20 July 1963) is an Druze-Israeli politician. He served as a member of the Knesset for the Zionist Union and Labor Party between 2017 and 2019.

Biography
Saad was born in Beit Jann, and served in the Israeli security forces as a combatant for twelve years. He became a director of the Galilee Local Council Workers Division, and was also chairman of the Galilee branch of the Histadrut. A member of the Labor Party, he was placed 25th on the party's list for the 2013 Knesset elections, However, he failed to win a seat.

Prior to the 2015 Knesset elections, Saad was given the 26th place on the list of the Zionist Union (an alliance of Labor and Hatnuah), a spot reserved for a Druze candidate. Although the alliance won only 24 seats, Saad entered the Knesset on 3 October 2017 as a replacement for Manuel Trajtenberg, who had retired from politics. He was placed seventeenth on the Labor list for the April 2019 elections, but the party won only six seats.

References

External links

1963 births
Living people
Druze members of the Knesset
Israeli Druze
Israeli Labor Party politicians
Israeli trade unionists
Members of the 20th Knesset (2015–2019)
People from Beit Jann
Zionist Union politicians